Elections were held in Lennox and Addington County, Ontario on October 24, 2022 in conjunction with municipal elections across the province.

Lennox and Addington County Council
The Lennox and Addington County Council consists of the three municipal reeves, mayor of Greater Napanee and the three deputy reeves and the Deputy Reeve of Greater Napanee.

Addington Highlands
Addington Highlands is divided into two wards.  Of the five members of council, the Reeve is elected “at large” by vote of all the electors and the two of the four councillors are elected by the voters in this ward.

Reeve

Deputy Reeve
(selected from council)

Councillor Ward 1

Councillor Ward 2

Greater Napanee
Greater Napanee is divided into five wards.  Of the seven members of council, the Mayor and Deputy Mayor are elected “at large” by vote of all the electors and one of the five councillors are elected by the voters in this ward.

Mayor
Mayor Marg Isbester did not run for re-election.

Deputy Mayor

Ward 1 Councillor

Ward 2 Councillor

Ward 3 Councillor

Ward 4 Councillor

Ward 5 Councillor

Loyalist
Loyalist is divided into three wards.  Of the seven members of council, the Mayor and Deputy Mayor are elected “at large” by vote of all the electors and one of the five councillors are elected by the voters in this ward.

Mayor
Previous mayor Ric Bresee was elected to the Ontario Legislature in the 2022 Ontario general election for the Progressive Conservative Party of Ontario in the riding of Hastings—Lennox and Addington. Deputy mayor Jim Hegadorn was appointed mayor August 8, and is running for election for a full term.

Deputy Mayor

Stone Mills
Stone Mills holds elections at large.  All the seven members of council, the Reeve, Deputy Reeve and five councillors are elected by the voters.

Reeve

Deputy Reeve

Councillors (At Large)

References

Lennox
Lennox and Addington County